The 1987 Indiana Hoosiers football team represented Indiana University Bloomington as a member of the Big Ten Conference during the 1987 NCAA Division I-A football season. Led by fourth-year head coach Bill Mallory, the Hoosiers compiled an overall record of 8–4 with a mark of 6–2 in conference play, tying for second place in the Big Ten. Indiana was invited to the  Peach Bowl, where they lost to Tennessee. The team played home games at Memorial Stadium in Bloomington, Indiana.

Season recap
In their season opener against Rice, Anthony Thompson rushed for 105 yards and a pair of touchdowns en route to a 35–13 Indiana win. However, in what was the renewal of their rivalry against Kentucky, the Hoosiers lost 34–15 at Lexington. Indiana rebounded from their loss to the Wildcats with a five-game winning streak. After a win over Missouri, Indiana defeated Northwestern to open their conference schedule behind a 170-yard, and two touchdown performance by Thompson. The next week, the Hoosiers traveled to Columbus to play No. 9 Ohio State, and for the first time since 1951 Indiana defeated the Buckeyes in their 31–10 upset victory.

Indiana followed their upset with a win at Minnesota after Chip Lohmiller missed what would have been a game-winning field goal in the final minutes for the Gophers. The Hoosiers then returned to Bloomington where they defeated Michigan for the first time since the 1967 season to move into first place in the Big Ten standings. After their win over the Wolverines, Indiana was ranked No. 11, however they went on to split their final four games with losses against Iowa and Michigan State and victories over Illinois and Purdue and finished the regular season tied for second in conference with an overall record of eight wins and three losses.

In November, the Hoosiers accepted an invitation to play in the Peach Bowl against Tennessee of the Southeastern Conference Against the Volunteers, Indiana fell behind by a score of 21–3. However, the Hoosiers rallied and took a 22–21 lead in the fourth quarter only to fall 27–22 after Tennessee scored a late touchdown.

Schedule

1988 NFL draftees

References

Indiana
Indiana Hoosiers football seasons
Indiana Hoosiers football